Japan Center may refer to:

Japan Center (Frankfurt)
Japan Center (San Francisco)
Japan Centers in Russia
Japan Center for Michigan Universities, located in Shiga Prefecture, Japan
Japan Center for International Exchange

Japan Foundation-sponsored 22 organizations outside of Japan to introduce Japanese culture, when spoken in English, are often called Japan Centers:
 Maison de la culture du Japon in Paris
 Japanisches Kulturinstitut in Cologne
 Istituto Giapponese di Cultura in Rome
etc.